Ashraf Daniel Mohamad Sinclair (18 September 1979 – 18 February 2020) was a Malaysian actor known for his role as Eddy in the 2005 film Gol & Gincu.

Career 
Sinclair began his career in 1997 as the second runner-up of the Hero Remaja men's pageant contest. He later made his acting career debut in the 1998 Petronas commercial Kasut Gombak, along with Vanida Imran. He was also once a host of Box Office Now that was aired on ntv7. Later, he starred in shows such as Gol & Gincu The Series as well as Realiti which aired on 8TV.

In 2017, Sinclair became a venture partner of 500 Startups, a global venture capital seed funder.

Personal life
Sinclair was the eldest of three siblings, his sister is Aishah.

Sinclair married Indonesian singer Bunga Citra Lestari on 8 November 2008. They met in 2007 in Malaysia, while he was hosting Beat TV and Lestari was promoting her album. Sinclair resided in Indonesia after his marriage. The couple had one child.

Death
On 18 February 2020, Sinclair died of a heart attack at Metropolitan Medical Centre in Jakarta. On the same day, his remains were buried in San Diego Hills, West Java.

Filmography

Film

Television series

Sinetron

Television

References

External links

1979 births
2020 deaths
Malaysian television personalities
British expatriates in Indonesia
Malaysian expatriates in Indonesia
Male actors from London
People from Croydon